The Aphrodite Women Cup is a global invitational tournament for national teams in women's association football. It has been held annually in Cyprus since 2015. As the competition takes place in Cyprus, the hosts have won the competition for the first time in 2019.

It is played at the same time as the Algarve Cup, the Cyprus Women's Cup, the SheBelieves Cup and the Turkish Women's Cup.

Format
The Aphrodite Women Cup uses the following two-phase format:

The first phase is a group stage in which the twelve invited teams are divided into three groups of four teams. Similar to the Algarve Cup, the teams in Group A and Group B consist of higher-ranked teams and are the only teams actually in contention for the championship; Group C consists of lower-ranked teams. Each group plays a round-robin of six games, with each team playing one match against each of the other teams in the same group.

The second phase is a single "finals day" in which six games involving all twelve teams are played to determine the tournament's final standings, with the match-ups as follows:

1st place match: Winners of Groups A and B.
3rd place match: Runners up of Groups A and B.
5th place match: Third placed of Groups A and B.

Results

Previous Tournaments

2015
Notes: Azerbaijan replaced Qatar, who withdrew.

Group A

Group B

Placements
Sources

2016

2017

Group A

Group B

Placements
Source

References

External links

 
International association football competitions in Europe
International association football competitions hosted by Cyprus
Women's football competitions in Cyprus
International women's association football invitational tournaments
Recurring sporting events established in 2015
2015 establishments in Cyprus